Frank Hoffmann (born May 23, 1980) is a former Canadian football guard who played one season with the Toronto Argonauts of the Canadian Football League. He was drafted by the Toronto Argonauts in the fourth round of the 2004 CFL Draft. He first enrolled at Temple University before transferring to York University.

Professional career

Toronto Argonauts
Hoffman was drafted by the Toronto Argonauts with the 30th pick in the 2004 CFL Draft. He was released by the Argonauts on June 13, 2005.

References

External links
Just Sports Stats
Frank Hoffmann trading card

Living people
1980 births
Players of Canadian football from Ontario
Canadian football offensive linemen
Canadian players of American football
Temple Owls football players
York Lions football players
Toronto Argonauts players
Canadian football people from Toronto